Associazione Calcio ChievoVerona, commonly referred to as ChievoVerona or simply Chievo , is a former professional Italian football club named after and based in Chievo, a suburb of 4,500 inhabitants in Verona, Veneto, and owned by Paluani, a bakery product company and the inspiration for their original name, Paluani Chievo. During its years as a professional club, Chievo shared the 38,402 seater Stadio Marcantonio Bentegodi stadium with its cross-town rivals Hellas Verona.

Following the club's exclusion from professional football in 2021, Chievo is solely running as a youth team for the current 2021–22 season. The club was excluded from professional football because of financial problems.

History

Early years
The team was founded in 1929 by a small number of football fans from Chievo, a Verona . Initially the club was not officially affiliated to the Italian Football Federation (FIGC), but nonetheless played several amateur tournament and friendly matches under the denomination O.N.D. Chievo, a title imposed by the fascist regime. The club's formal debut in an official league was on 8 November 1931. The team colours at the time were blue and white. In 1957, the team moved to the field "Carlantonio Bottagisio", where they played until 1986. In 1959, after the restructuring of the football leagues, Chievo was admitted to play the Seconda Categoria (Second Category), a regional league placed next-to-last in the Italian football pyramid. That year, Chievo changed its name to Cardi Chievo, after a new sponsor, and was quickly promoted to the Prima Categoria, from which it experienced its first-ever relegation in 1962.

Series of promotions
In 1964, Luigi Campedelli, a businessman and owner of the Paluani company, was named new Chievo chairman. Under Campedelli's presidency, Chievo climbed through the entire Italian football pyramid, reaching the Serie D after the 1974–75 season. Under the name "Paluani Chievo", the team was promoted to Serie C2 in 1986. As a consequence of promotion, Chievo was forced to move to the Stadio Marcantonio Bentegodi, the main venue in Verona; another promotion, to Serie C1, followed in 1989. In 1990, the team changed its name to its current one, "A.C. ChievoVerona."

In 1992, President Luigi Campedelli, who had returned at the helm of the club two years before, died of a heart attack, and his son Luca Campedelli, aged just 23, became the new and youngest chairman of an Italian professional football club. Campedelli promoted Giovanni Sartori to director of football and named Alberto Malesani as the new head coach. Under Malesani, the team astonishingly won the Serie C1 and was promoted to Serie B, where city rival Hellas Verona was playing at the time. In 1997, after Malesani signed for Fiorentina, Silvio Baldini was appointed the new head coach. The following season, with Domenico Caso as the coach, saw the first dismissal of a coach during the presidency of Luca Campedelli, with Caso being fired and replaced with Lorenzo Balestro. It was during these years that the nickname "mussi volanti" ("flying donkeys") was born. It originated from supporters of their crosstown rivals Hellas, who would mock long-suffering Chievo supporters that Chievo will only be promoted if "donkeys could fly" (equivalent of the English language falsism "if pigs could fly", denoting an impossible dream).

In 2000–01, Luigi Delneri was signed as coach and led Chievo, by virtue of its third-place finish in Serie B, to promotion to Serie A, the first time in team history that it had reached the top tier of Italian football.

Mussi Volanti (2001–2007)
In 2001–02, Chievo's Serie A debut season, the team was most critics' choice for an instant return to Serie B. However, they became the surprise team in the league, playing often spectacular and entertaining football and even leading the league for six consecutive weeks. The club finally ended the season with a highly respectable fifth-place finish, qualifying the team to play in the UEFA Cup. Chievo's impressive performance inspired a 2002 book about soccer economics titled "Fenomeno Chievo. Economia, costume, società" by Marco Vitale.

In 2002–03, Chievo debuted at the European level but were eliminated in the first round by Red Star Belgrade. The team finished the Serie A season in seventh place, again proving itself one of the better Serie A teams. The 2003–04 season, the last with Delneri at the helm, saw Chievo finish ninth.

The 2004–05 season is remembered as one of the toughest ever in Chievo's history. Mario Beretta, a Serie A novice from Ternana, was named coach, but after a strong start that brought Chievo to third behind Juventus and Milan, the team slowly lost position in the league table. With three matches remaining in the season, Chievo was third-from-last, a position which would see it relegated to Serie B. As a last resort, Beretta was fired and Maurizio D'Angelo, a former Chievo player, was appointed temporarily to replace him as coach. Morale improved, and two wins and a draw from the final three matches proved just enough to keep Chievo in Serie A.

In 2005–06, Giuseppe Pillon of Treviso FBC was appointed as new coach. The team experienced a return to the successful Delneri era, both in style of play and results, which resulted in Chievo ending the season in seventh and gaining a berth in the UEFA Cup. However, because of the football scandal involving several top-class teams, all of which finished higher than Chievo in the 2005–06 season, the Flying Donkeys were awarded a place in the next Champions League preliminary phase.

On 14 July 2006, the verdict in the scandal was made public. Juventus, Milan and Fiorentina, who had all originally qualified for the 2006–07 Champions League, and Lazio, who had originally qualified for the 2006–07 UEFA Cup, were all banned from UEFA competition for the 2006–07 season, although Milan were allowed to enter the Champions League after their appeal to the FIGC. Chievo took up a place in the third qualifying stage of the competition along with Milan and faced Bulgarian side Levski Sofia. Chievo lost the first leg 2–0 in Sofia and managed a 2–2 home draw on the second leg and were eliminated by a 4–2 aggregate score with Levski advancing to the Champions League group stage. As a Champions League third round qualifying loser, Chievo was given a place in the UEFA Cup final qualifying round. On 25 August 2006, they were drawn to face Portuguese side Braga. The first leg, played on 14 September in Braga, ended in a 2–0 win for the Portuguese. The return match, played on 28 September in Verona, although won by Chievo 2–1, resulted in a 3–2 aggregate loss and the club's elimination from the competition.

On 16 October 2006, following a 1–0 defeat against Torino, head coach Giuseppe Pillon was fired, and replaced by Luigi Delneri, one of the original symbols of the miracle Chievo, who had led the club to the Serie A in 2002.

On 27 May 2007, the last match day of the 2006–07 Serie A season, Chievo was one of five teams in danger of falling into the last undecided relegation spot. Needing only a draw against Catania, a direct competitor in the relegation battle, Chievo lost 2–0 playing on a neutral field in Bologna. Wins by Parma, Siena and Reggina condemned Chievo to Serie B for the 2007–08 season after six seasons in the top flight.

Even as a relatively-successful Serie A team the club, which averages only 9,000 to 10,000 fans and is kept afloat mainly by money from television rights, does not have the same number of fan supporters as Hellas, the oldest team in Verona. The difference between the clubs' supporters' number was highlighted during local derby games played in season 2001–02 at the clubs' shared stadium when, for Chievo's "home" fixtures, the Chievo fans were located in the "away" end of the stadium (the area of the stadium Chievo's supporters for years claimed as "theirs", in fact the main supporters faction's name is "North Side", the side of the stadium usually assigned to away teams' supporters), while most of the rest of the stadium seats were assigned to Hellas supporters.

A year with the Cadetti (2007–08)
Chievo bounced back quickly from the disappointment of their relegation on the last matchday of 2006–07, going in search of an immediate promotion back to the top flight. After the expected departure of several top-quality players including Franco Semioli, Salvatore Lanna, Matteo Brighi, Paolo Sammarco and Erjon Bogdani, the manager Delneri also parted ways with the club. Giuseppe Iachini replaced him and the captain, Lorenzo D'Anna, gave way to Sergio Pellissier at the end of the transfer window. A new squad was constructed, most notably including the arrivals of midfielders Maurizio Ciaramitaro and Simone Bentivoglio, defender César and forward Antimo Iunco. This new incarnation of the gialloblu were crowned winter champions (along with Bologna), en route to a 41st matchday promotion after a 1–1 draw at Grosseto left them four points clear of third-place Lecce with one match remaining. In addition to winning promotion, they were conferred with the Ali della Vittoria trophy on the final matchday of the season, their first league title of any kind in 14 years.

Back in Serie A (2008–2019)
In their first season back to the top flight, Chievo immediately struggled in the league resulting in the dismissal of Iachini in November and his replacement with former Parma boss Domenico Di Carlo. After Di Carlo's appointment, Chievo managed a remarkable resurgence that led the gialloblu out of the relegation zone after having collected just nine points from their first 17 matches. Highlight matches included a 3–0 defeat of Lazio (who then won the 2008–09 Coppa Italia title) at the Stadio Olimpico, and a thrilling 3–3 draw away to Juventus in which captain and longtime Chievo striker Sergio Pellissier scored a late equaliser to complete his first career hat-trick. A series of hard-fought draws against top clubs Roma, Internazionale and Genoa in the final stretch of the season solidified Ceo's position outside the drop zone and Serie A status was finally confirmed on matchday 37 with a home draw against Bologna. A largely unchanged line-up earned safety the following season with four matchdays to spare, and Chievo is therefore a part of the inaugural Lega Calcio Serie A in 2010–11, their third consecutive season (and ninth season in the last ten years) in the top flight of Italian football.

Lorenzo D'Anna remained as coach of the club for the 2018–19 season after replacing Rolando Maran during the 2017–18 season. On 13 September, Chievo were deducted 3 points after being found guilty of false accounting on exchanging players with Cesena. President Luca Campedelli was banned for three months as a result of the scheme. Chievo were officially relegated on 14 April 2019 after a 3–1 home loss to Napoli.

Serie B years and league exclusion (2019–2021)
In July 2021, Chievo was expelled from Serie B for the 2021–22 season for being unable to prove its financial viability due to outstanding tax payments. The club argued that there was an agreement in place during the COVID-19 pandemic that allowed them to spread the payments out over a longer period. However, after three unsuccessful appeals, the decision to bar Chievo Verona from registering to Serie B was upheld, with Cosenza taking their place in Serie B.

Over the next month, former captain Sergio Pellissier led the search for a new ownership group to allow a phoenix club to compete in Serie D under the Chievo name. However, on 21 August, Pellissier announced in an Instagram post that no owners were found in time for the Serie D registration deadline. The original Chievo club has in the meantime appealed to the Council of State against its exclusion and is currently registered in no division, albeit still with the right to apply for a spot in an amateur league of Veneto in the following weeks. Campedelli eventually opted to keep the club alive as a youth team for the 2021–22 season, while Pellissier decided instead
to found a new club himself, which was admitted to Terza Categoria at the very bottom of the Italian football league system; the club, originally named FC Chievo 2021, was then renamed to FC Clivense following a legal warning from AC ChievoVerona.

FC Clivense eventually won Group B of the Terza Categoria Verona 2021–22, ending up promoted in Seconda Categoria.

On 13 July, FC Clivense registered for the 2022/23 season of Eccellenza, the 5th tier of Italian football.

Historical names 

 1929 – O.N.D. Chievo (Opera Nazionale Dopolavoro Chievo)
 1936 – folded
 1948 – refounded as A.C. Chievo (Associazione Calcio Chievo)
 1960 – A.C. Cardi Chievo (Associazione Calcio Cardi Chievo)
 1975 – A.C. Chievo (Associazione Calcio Chievo)
 1981 – A.C. Paluani Chievo (Associazione Calcio Paluani Chievo)
 1986 – A.C. Chievo (Associazione Calcio Chievo)
 1990 – A.C. ChievoVerona (Associazione Calcio ChievoVerona)

Retired numbers
 30  Jason Mayélé, left/right winger, 2001–2002 (posthumous)
 31  Sergio Pellissier, left/right winger, 2000–2019 (retired in recognition of his career)

Notable players
Note: this list includes players that have reached international status.

 Francesco Acerbi
 Amauri
 Daniel Andersson
 Simone Barone
 Andrea Barzagli
 Erjon Bogdani
 Oliver Bierhoff
 Valter Birsa
 Albano Bizzarri
 Michael Bradley
 Matteo Brighi
 Boštjan Cesar
 Bernardo Corradi
 Rinaldo Cruzado
 Dario Dainelli
 Boukary Dramé
 Mauro Esposito
 Marcelo Estigarribia
 Ivan Fatić
 Gelson Fernandes
 Giannis Fetfatzidis
 Stefano Fiore
 Alessandro Gamberini
 Massimo Gobbi
 Jonathan de Guzmán
 Përparim Hetemaj
 Bojan Jokić
 Radoslav Kirilov
 Kamil Kosowski
 Nicola Legrottaglie
 Christian Manfredini
 Jason Mayélé
 Stephen Makinwa
 John Mensah
 Victor Obinna
 Sergio Pellissier
 Simone Pepe
 Simone Perrotta
 Mauricio Pinilla
 Giampiero Pinzi
 Ivan Radovanović
 Flavio Roma
 Fredrik Risp
 Mamadou Samassa
 Nikos Spyropoulos
 Samir Ujkani
 Sauli Väisänen
 Martin Valjent
 Mario Yepes

See :Category:A.C. ChievoVerona players for all Chievo players.

Coaches

Colours and badge
The club's original colours were blue and white and not the current blue and yellow. The club's historic nickname is Gialloblu (from the club colours of yellow and blue), although throughout Italian football, the Verona's team recognised in the past by most fans as Gialloblu are Hellas Verona, Chievo's main rivals. Local supporters often call the club simply Ceo, which is Venetian for Chievo. The club is now sometimes referred to as the I Mussi Volanti ("The Flying Donkeys" in the Verona dialect of Venetian). "The Flying Donkeys" nickname was originally used by fans from crosstown rivals Hellas to mock Chievo. The two clubs first met in Serie B in the mid-1990s, with Hellas chanting Quando i mussi volara, il Ceo in Serie A – "Donkeys will fly before Chievo are in Serie A." However, once Chievo earned promotion to Serie A at the end of the 2000–01 Serie B season, Chievo fans started to call themselves "The Flying Donkeys".

The current club crest represents Cangrande I della Scala, a medieval lord of Verona.

Stadium
Stadio Marcantonio Bentegodi is a stadium in Verona, Italy. It is also the home of Chievo Verona city rival Hellas.

Honours
 Serie B
 Winners: 2007–08
 Serie C1
 Winners: 1993–94 (group A)
Serie C2
 Winners: 1988–89 (group B)
Serie D
 Winners: 1985–86 (group C)

In Europe

UEFA Champions League

UEFA Cup

References

External links

Official website

 
Association football clubs established in 1929
Association football clubs disestablished in 2021
Football clubs in Veneto
Sport in Verona
Defunct football clubs in Italy
1929 establishments in Italy
2021 disestablishments in Italy
Serie D clubs
Serie C clubs
Serie B clubs
Serie A clubs